Villophora is a genus of lichen-forming fungi in the subfamily Teloschistoideae of the family Teloschistaceae. It has 9 species. The genus was circumscribed in 2013 by Ulrik Søchting, Ulf Arup, and Patrik Frödén. They assigned Villophora isidioclada as the type, and at that time, only species in the genus. This lichen, previously classified in Caloplaca, is found in South America, Antarctica, and some subantarctic islands. Several additional species were added to the genus in 2021. The generic name Villophora means "carrying filaments".

Species

Villophora darwiniana 
Villophora erythrosticta 
Villophora isidioclada 
Villophora maulensis 
Villophora microphyllina 
Villophora onas 
Villophora patagonica 
Villophora rimicola 
Villophora wallaceana

References

Teloschistales
Lichen genera
Taxa described in 2013
Teloschistales genera